HD 154345 b is a Jupiter-sized extrasolar planet orbiting the star HD 154345.

Discovery
Wright et al. discovered the planet in March 2006 using the radial velocity method to detect the small wobbling movement of the star caused by the gravity of the planet. The discovery was published in May 2007.

The existence of HD 154345 b has been controversial, but in 2021 its planetary status was confirmed.

Characteristics
The planet has a mass at least slightly less than that of Jupiter. It orbits its parent star at the distance of 4.18 AU. Its orbital period is about 9.095 Earth years and its orbit is circular. There are no interior planets of minimum mass (m sini) greater than 0.3 Jupiter. Jupiter-like planets with these orbital and system characteristics are unlikely to be perturbed from the star's inclination. Since the star's inclination is known as around 50°, this would make the planet's most likely mass greater than Jupiter's mass but less than twice that mass.

As such HD 154345 b is presumed to be a gas giant "Jupiter twin". Depending on composition the two planets may be around the same size, or HD 154345 b may be larger. This planet may also harbor a system of moons and rings.

See also
 HD 24040 b

References

Hercules (constellation)
Exoplanets discovered in 2006
Giant planets
Exoplanets detected by radial velocity